Texel Air is a cargo airline and MRO based in Bahrain. It was founded in 2013 and commenced operations in 2014. The airline has its main hub at the Bahrain International Airport and its fleet consists of one Boeing 737-300F aircraft, two Boeing 737-800BCF as well as two Boeing 737-700FC FlexCombi, capable of swiftly converting between passenger and cargo operations.

Fleet

Current fleet
The Texel Air fleet consists of the following aircraft (as of April 2022):

Former fleet
3 further Boeing 737-300F

See also
 List of airlines of Bahrain

References 

Airlines of Bahrain
Airlines established in 2013
Cargo airlines of Bahrain
Bahraini companies established in 2013